Dust consists of fine, solid particles of matter borne in the air settling onto surfaces.
 
Dust may also refer to:

Film 
Dust (1916 film), a 1916 American film by Edward Sloman
Dust (1985 film), a film based on J. M. Coetzee's In the Heart of the Country
Dust (2001 film) or Прашина, a film directed by Milčo Mančevski
Dust or Toz, a 2005 Turkish film
Dust (2005 film) or Пыль, a Russian film by Serguei Loban
Dust (2009 film), a film by Max Jacoby
Dust (2012 film), a Guatemalan film
Dust (upcoming film), an American psychological horror-thriller

Literature
Dust (novel), a 2013 novel by Patricia Cornwell
Dust (comics), a character in the X-Men franchise
Dust (His Dark Materials), a fictional form of matter in Philip Pullman's His Dark Materials
Dust, a novel in the Jacob's Ladder Trilogy by Elizabeth Bear
Dust, a 2007 novel by Martha Grimes
Dust, a 2013 novel in the Silo series by Hugh Howey
Dust, a 1998 novel by Charles R. Pellegrino
Dust, a 2001 novel by Arthur Slade
Dust, a comic book series from Image Comics
"Dust", a poem by Rupert Brooke

Music
Dust (band), a 1970s hard rock group

Albums
Dust (Ellen Allien album) (2010)
Dust (Benjy Davis Project album) (2007)
Dust (DJ Muggs album) (2003)
Dust (Dust album) (1971)
Dust (Laurel Halo album) (2017)
Dust (Ben Monder album) (1997)
Dust (Peter Murphy album) (2002)
Dust (Peatbog Faeries album) (2011)
Dust (Screaming Trees album) (1996)
Dust (Tremonti album) (2016)

Songs
"Dust" (Royworld song)
"Dust" (Eli Young Band song)
"Dust", a 2008 song by Bic Runga from Try to Remember Everything
"Dust", a 2004 song by Van Hunt from Van Hunt

Television
"Dust" (The Twilight Zone), a 1961 episode of The Twilight Zone
"Dust" (Sliders), a 2000 episode of Sliders
Dust, a magical element used in the RWBY web series
Dust, a science fiction label for Gunpowder & Sky Studios; see Kyle Higgins

Video games 
Dust: A Tale of the Wired West, a 1995 PC adventure game
Dust: An Elysian Tail, a 2012 video game
Dust 514, an MMO/FPS console game developed by CCP
Dust II, a video game level map in the online multiplayer first-person shooter Counter-Strike

Science and technology
Dust (relativity), an idealization of a cold gas
Angel dust, a name for phencyclidine
Asian dust, meteorological phenomenon from East Asia
Cantor dust, a zero-measure 2D fractal
Cosmic dust or interstellar dust, in intergalactic clouds
Dust solution, a type of exact solution in general relativity
Mineral dust, atmospheric aerosols of mineral origin
Neural dust, proposed application of smartdust as a brain-computer interface
Smartdust, miniaturized wireless sensor networks

Other uses
Dust (ballet), a 2014 contemporary ballet choreographed by Akram Khan
Dust Networks, a US company specializing in the design and manufacture of wireless sensor networks
Fannings or dust, the lowest possible grade of tea

See also

Dustiness
Dust to Dust (disambiguation)
Dusted (disambiguation)
Dustin (disambiguation)
Dusting (disambiguation)
Dusty (disambiguation)